The Florena Shale is a stratigraphic unit in east-central Kansas, northeast-central Oklahoma, and southeastern Nebraska in the Midwestern United States. It preserves fossils dating to the Permian period.

See also

 List of fossiliferous stratigraphic units in Kansas
 List of fossiliferous stratigraphic units in Nebraska
 List of fossiliferous stratigraphic units in Oklahoma
 Paleontology in Kansas
 Paleontology in Nebraska
 Paleontology in Oklahoma

References

External links
 Stratigraphic Nomenclature

Permian Kansas
Geologic formations of Nebraska
Geologic formations of Oklahoma
Cisuralian Series of North America